Urd may refer to:

 Urðr, one of a group of three Norns in Norse mythology
 Urd (Oh My Goddess!), character in the manga and anime series Oh My Goddess!
 Urd (Dungeons & Dragons), a creature which appeared in the 2nd edition Monstrous Manual
 Urd (bean), a type of bean (Vigna mungo)
 Urd (album), a 2012 album by the black metal band Borknagar
 Urd, a mountain and the highest point on Bear Island, Svalbard, Norway 
 Urd (magazine)
 Urd Morlemoch - A dark elves citadel in Frostborn Omnibus by Jonathan Moeller
 Urdu (ISO 639-2 language code)

URD may refer to:

 Union for Republic and Democracy, a political party in Mali
 Union for Democratic Renewal, a political party in the Republic of the Congo
 Union for Democratic Renewal, a political party in Senegal
 Union for Renewal and Democracy, a political party in Chad
 Unión Republicana Democrática (Democratic Republican Union), a political party in Venezuela
 University of Religions and Denominations
 User requirements document
 Underground residential distribution, a type of electric power distribution
 Undead Roller Derby